Andover Forest is a neighborhood in southeastern Lexington, Kentucky, United States. Its boundaries are Man o' War Boulevard to the north, former railroad tracks (now the Brighton East Bike Path) to the north, Pleasant Ridge Drive to the east, and McFarland Lane to the south.

Neighborhood statistics
 Area: 
 Population: 1,128
 Population density: 2,475 people per square mile
 Median household income: $99,526

References

Neighborhoods in Lexington, Kentucky